Wojciech Piotr Szarama (born 16 December 1955 in Bytom) is a Polish politician. He was elected to Sejm on 25 September 2005, getting 9280 votes in 29 Gliwice district as a candidate from the Law and Justice list.

He was also a member of Sejm 2001-2005, 2005-2007, 2007-2011, 2011–2015, 2015-2019, 2019-2023.

See also
Members of Polish Sejm 2005-2007

External links
Wojciech Piotr Szarama - parliamentary page - includes declarations of interest, voting record, and transcripts of speeches.

1955 births
Living people
People from Bytom
Law and Justice politicians
Solidarity Electoral Action politicians
Movement for Reconstruction of Poland politicians
Members of the Polish Sejm 2001–2005
Members of the Polish Sejm 2005–2007
Members of the Polish Sejm 2007–2011
Members of the Polish Sejm 2011–2015
Members of the Polish Sejm 2015–2019
Members of the Polish Sejm 2019–2023
University of Silesia in Katowice alumni